Trevan Clough (born 27 October 1942) is a Papua New Guinean former sports shooter. He competed at the 1976 Summer Olympics and 1984 Summer Olympics.

References

1942 births
Living people
Papua New Guinean male sport shooters
Olympic shooters of Papua New Guinea
Shooters at the 1976 Summer Olympics
Shooters at the 1984 Summer Olympics
Commonwealth Games competitors for Papua New Guinea
Shooters at the 1978 Commonwealth Games